André de Souza Almeida (born 16 December 1992) is a Brazilian cyclist riding for .

Major results
2014
4th Overall Volta Ciclística Internacional do Rio Grande do Sul

References

1992 births
Living people
Brazilian male cyclists
Brazilian road racing cyclists
Sportspeople from Florianópolis